Jack Tull Casey (January 2, 1909 - March 12, 1974) was a member of the California State Assembly for the 38th District. He was a member of the Education Committee. During his one term in the Assembly he authored the state's Medi-Cal legislation.

In the 1960s the 38th district represented parts of Bakersfield, California. Casey attended a speech by then-Senator John F. Kennedy at the Bakersfield Airport in 1960.

Personal life

Casey was married to Ruth N. McNaughton in 1935 and had one child, Sharon Marie. According to Political Graveyard, Casey was a Member of Native Sons of the Golden West, the Freemasons, and the American Association of University Professors.

References

External links
Join California Jack T. Casey

Democratic Party members of the California State Assembly
1909 births
1974 deaths
20th-century American politicians